Zambian Open University (ZAOU) is a private university, founded in 2002. It is one of the oldest private universities in Zambia. It is a member of the Association of Commonwealth Universities. The University boasts of a top academic record for its Law students in 2017 admitted to the bar followed by the University of Zambia. The University has a vibrant Students Union that addresses student needs in a more professional and mature manner. In 2018, the Students Union launched what is called the Student Revolving Fund to support vulnerable students.

School of Education 

The School of Education is one of the two original Schools of the Zambian Open University (ZAOU) that started as soon as the University opened its doors to students in 2005. The other pioneer school was the School of Law and Social Sciences. 

The School of Education started with three programmes namely Bachelor of Education in Adult Education, Bachelor of Education in Primary Education and Bachelor of Education in Secondary Education. Later the School developed three other programmes: Bachelor of Education in Early Childhood Education, Bachelor of Education in Guidance and Counselling and Bachelor of Education in Special Education. 

In 2012, the University decided to abolish the School of Media, Performing and Fine Arts. As a result, Fine Arts was absorbed into the School of Humanities and Social Sciences, while Theatre Arts was incorporated in the School of Education, thus giving seven programmes to the School of Education, making it the biggest School in the University.

School of Agriculture 

The School aims at producing graduates that posses agricultural skills to develop the agricultural sector. The school offers several degree programmes.

Undergraduate programs offered;

Bachelor of Science (Animal Science)

Bachelor of Science (Agricultural Science with Education)

Bachelor of Science ( Agribusiness Management)

Bachelor of Science ( Agricultural Economics)

Bachelor of Science ( Agricultural Extension)

Bachelor of Science (Horticulture)

Bachelor of Science (Plant Science)

School of Humanities and Social Sciences 

The School of Humanities and Social Sciences has three Departments, namely, Development Studies, Governance and Public Administration and Fine Arts. Each of these Departments offers a Degree Programme.

On completion, graduates from the Department of Fine Arts find jobs in many areas: They can start their own companies as designers; they can be employed by textile companies as Designers; they can join the Ministry of Education as teachers of Art; they can have their own Studios and sell their art works.

Undergraduate Degrees offered;

Bachelor of Arts with Development Studies
�

Bachelor of Arts in Governance and Public Administration

Bachelor of Arts in Fine Arts

Bachelor of Arts in Sociology

Bachelor of Social Work

School of Law 

The School of Law at Zambian Open University is the second law school to be established in Zambia after the school of law at the University of Zambia. It is one of the oldest schools at ZAOU. The School of Law is currently the biggest Law School in Zambia. It is proving to be a highly competitive law school judged by the high percentage in comparative terms to those from other law schools, who pass the ZIALE examinations and thus enter the legal practitioners market.

The school offers the traditional LLB courses by a diverse faculty leading to an LLB degree that provides students with a sound knowledge of the general principles of the Zambian legal system with an international component, and an ability to use legal materials effectively.

School of Post Graduate Studies & Research 

The Zambian Open University started offering pot-graduate studies in 2006 with an intake of 15 students in one programme – Master’s degree of Education in Literacy and Development. Since then twelve more postgraduate programmes have been introduced; and there are currently a total of twelve programmes.

School of Business 

The School of Business Studies aims at equipping students with critical and state of the art managerial skills, Including leadership, sound judgment, entrepreneurship, ethical business decision-making, and sharp analytical thinking. The School also aims at upgrading the knowledge and skills of established managers in government and industry.

The School of business Studies offers a number of degree programmes which include Bachelors, Masters and PhD programmes. The Programmes are offered on full-time and open and distance learning.

ACCA Accreditation 
 
Bachelor of Business Administration (Accounting) Degree Programme offered by the Zambian Open University was in January, 2020 accredited by the Association of Charted Certified Accountants (ACCA). In this regard ACCA members will be offered Exemptions in order to obtain a Degree in Bachelor of Business (Accountancy) offered by ZAOU. ACCA Members/Students are encouraged to take this opportunity of a lifetime

Association of Chartered Certified Accountants a leading international accountancy body. The ACCA qualification is recognised and is treated in other countries as being equivalent to their local qualification.

The ACCA qualification proves to employers that you have ability in all aspects of business.

It is the largest and fastest growing qualification in the world, with over 500,000 members and students in 170 countries.

ZAOU students vs the Zambia Institute for Advanced Legal Education (ZIALE) 

In 2009 the Lusaka High Court ordered the Zambia Institute for Advanced Legal Education (ZIALE) to enrol law students from Zambia Open University (ZAOU) for the 2009 and 2010 legal practitioners qualifying course after the student took ZIALE to court. The High Court Judge Nigel Mutuna in his judgment delivered in chambers also directed the counsel for ZIALE to certify the ZAOU law degree qualifications as being equivalent to those offered at the University of Zambia (UNZA).This move by ZAOU students enabled law students from other private universities to be enrolled at ZIALE to this day.

Notable Alumni 

Vincent Mwale (Former Minister)

Jean Kapata (Former Minister)

Coaster Mwansa (Media Personality)

Simon Mwila Mulenga (Lawyer)

References

External links 
Zambian Open University Website

Zambian Open University
Education in Lusaka
Private universities and colleges
Educational institutions established in 2002
2002 establishments in Zambia
Buildings and structures in Lusaka